Dept. of Speculation is a 2014 novel by American author Jenny Offill. The novel received positive reviews, and has been compared to Offill's later work, Weather.

Composition and writing
Though not purely autobiographical, the novel draws from Offill's life. Offill has said Dept. of Speculation "[...] came from the ashes of another book". Dept. of Speculation eschews a typical plot, which Offill has said was deliberate.

Reception

Critical reception
According to literary review aggregator Book Marks, the book received mostly "Rave" and reviews, with some less positive reception. The novel has been compared to Renata Adler's 1976 book Speedboat. In her review of the book, published by NPR, Meg Wolitzer praised the novel as "[...] intriguing, beautifully written, sly and often profound". Wolitzer also praised the novel's humor.

Offill has said she did not anticipate the book's success.

Honors
Dept. of Speculation was shortlisted for 2015 PEN/Faulkner Award for Fiction, and the Folio Prize.

The novel was included on the New York Times' list of the best books of 2014.

Influence
A passage in the novel influenced Rachel Yoder's novel Nightbitch.

References

2014 American novels
Novels set in New York City
Alfred A. Knopf books